Pierre Antoine Monneron (16 January 1747 – 8 June 1801) was a French merchant, banker, writer and politician.

Monneron was born in Annonay, Ardèche.  He was deputy to the French National Convention for Mauritius. His brothers, Joseph François Augustin Monneron and Louis Monneron, were also active in French national and colonial politics of the time, whilst his brother Charles Claude Ange Monneron was an engineer and explorer.

Pierre Monneron died in Pamplemousses, Mauritius, aged 54.

References

1747 births
1801 deaths
People from Annonay
Deputies to the French National Convention